The Ukita clan (宇喜多氏, Ukita-shi) was a Japanese samurai clan of daimyos. The Ukita clan ruled Bizen Province and Bingo Province etc in the late Sengoku period.

History
The Ukita were a local samurai clan in Bizen but became powerful daimyo when Ukita Naoie was the head of the clan. Ukita Hideie became Toyotomi Hideyoshi's one of the five great senior retainers called Gotairō who helped Hideyoshi. Hideie belonged to the West squad in the Battle of Sekigahara, after the battle Ukita clan was demolished and Hideie was sentenced to exile on the Hachijō-jima.

Clan heads
 Ukita Muneie
 Ukita Hisaie
 Ukita Yoshiie
 Ukita Okiie
 Ukita Naoie
 Ukita Hideie

Notable retainers
 Ukita Haruie
 Ukita Tadaie: Naoie's younger brother.
 Togawa Hideyasu : He was a senior retainer of Naoie. His mother was a wet nurse of Naoie's younger brother Ukita Tadaie.
 Togawa Michiyasu : Togawa Hideyasu's son. He founded Niwase Domain after the Battle of Sekigahara
 Osafune Sadachika
 Oka Ietoshi
 Hanabusa Masayuki : He was a senior retainer.
 Hanbusa Masanari : Hanabusa Masayuki's son.
 Akashi Yukikatsu
 Akashi Takenori : His wife was Ukita Hideie's sister.

References

 
Sengoku period
Daimyo